Zimari is a rural locality (a selo) and the administrative center of Zimaryovsky Selsoviet, Kalmansky District, Altai Krai, Russia. The population was 775 as of 2013. There are 30 streets.

Geography 
Zimari is located 39 km north of Kalmanka (the district's administrative centre) by road. Prudskoy is the nearest rural locality.

References 

Rural localities in Kalmansky District